William John Norman (26 August 1926 – 2 November 2017) was an Australian rules footballer who played with Hawthorn in the Victorian Football League (VFL).

In 1951 he moved to VFA side Moorabbin before returning to Noble Park later in the season.

Notes

External links 

1926 births
Australian rules footballers from Victoria (Australia)
Hawthorn Football Club players
2017 deaths